The 2018–19 Liechtenstein Cup was the 74th season of Liechtenstein's annual cup competition. Seven clubs competed with a total of 15 teams for one spot in the first qualifying round of the 2019–20 UEFA Europa League. FC Vaduz were the defending champions.

Participating clubs

Teams in bold are still active in the competition.

TH Title holders.

First round
The first round involved all except the four highest-placed teams. Five teams received a bye to the second round by drawing of lot. FC Vaduz II did not enter the competition.

|colspan="3" style="text-align:center;background-color:#99CCCC"|21 August 2018

|-
|colspan="3" style="text-align:center;background-color:#99CCCC"|22 August 2018

|-
|colspan="3" style="text-align:center;background-color:#99CCCC"|28 August 2018

|}

Second round
The second round involved all except the four highest-placed teams. 

|colspan="3" style="text-align:center;background-color:#99CCCC"|12 September 2018

|-
|colspan="3" style="text-align:center;background-color:#99CCCC"|25 September 2018

|}

Quarterfinals
The quarterfinals involved the four teams who won in the second round, as well as the top four highest placed teams (FC Vaduz, FC Balzers, USV Eschen/Mauren  and FC Ruggell).

|colspan="3" style="text-align:center;background-color:#99CCCC"|23 October 2018

|-
|colspan="3" style="text-align:center;background-color:#99CCCC"|24 October 2018

|-
|colspan="3" style="text-align:center;background-color:#99CCCC"|7 November 2018

|}

Semifinals

|colspan="3" style="text-align:center;background-color:#99CCCC"|9 April 2019

|}

Final

|colspan="3" style="text-align:center;background-color:#99CCCC"|1 May 2019

|}

External links
 
RSSSF

Liechtenstein Football Cup seasons
Cup
Liechtenstein Cup